Rebecca 'Bec' Goddard  (born 1978) is an Australian rules football coach currently serving as the head coach of the Hawthorn Football Club in the AFL Women's competition (AFLW). Goddard also previously coached Adelaide Football Club in the AFL Women's competition (AFLW) between 2017 and 2018, winning the 2017 AFL Women's Grand Final. She was assistant coach of the University of Canberra Capitals in the Women's National Basketball League (WNBL) in 2018/19, when it won the league championship.

Playing career
Goddard played Australian rules football as a junior until the age of 13 before the absence of a girls competition forced her to stop. When Canberra got its first women's competition some seven years later, Goddard again returned to playing. She played for Belconnen at that level before a broken leg at age 29 forced her to swap her playing career for one in umpiring and coaching.

Umpiring career
Goddard holds the honour to be the first female field umpire in the North East Australian Football League (NEAFL).

Coaching career
Goddard began coaching at the  Gungahlin Jets in the AFL Canberra league. She served as assistant coach at the Queanbeyan Football Club as well as becoming the first female coach in the NEAFL. In 2016 she worked as the Under 18 boys forwards coach for Woodville West Torrens.

In 2016 Goddard was appointed the inaugural coach of the Adelaide Football Club's AFL Women's team. She was just one of two woman head coaches in the eight team league. She coached the club to the premiership success in its inaugural season the following year. In July 2017 she was named the coach of the Allies team in the AFLW State of Origin match to be played in September of that year.

In 2018 she coached Adelaide the a fifth-place finish, with three wins for the season. She resigned at season's end, electing to return to Canberra to resume full-time work with the Australian Federal Police. In Canberra, she became an assistant coach of the University of Canberra Capitals basketball team. The Capitals went on to win the Women's National Basketball League (WNBL) championship in 2019. Goddard attracted the interest of the Gold Coast Suns, who entered the AFLW competition in 2020, when it expanded 14 teams.  In 2021 she coached  in the VFL Women's (VFLW) competition.

In August 2021, following an announcement that  would enter the AFL Women's competition in 2022, Goddard was announced as the club's inaugural coach.

Coaching statistics
Updated to the end of 2022 (S7)

|-
| bgcolor=F0E68C | 2017# || 
| 8 || 6 || 2 || 0 || 75.0% || 2 || 8
|- 
| 2018 || 
| 7 || 3 || 3 || 1 || 42.9% || 5 || 8
|-
| S7 (2022) || 
| 10 || 3 || 7 || 0 || 30.0% || 15 || 18
|- class="sortbottom"
! colspan=2| Career totals
! 25 !! 12 !! 12 !! 1 !! 48.0%
! colspan=2|
|}

Honours and achievements
Team
 AFLW premiership coach: 2017

Individual
 All-Australian team: 2017
 Hawthorn games coached record holder: 10
 Hawthorn wins coached record holder: 3
  home and away games coached record holder: 10
  home and away wins coached record holder: 3
 Medal of the Order of Australia: 2021

Personal life
Outside of football, Goddard previously worked for the Australian Federal Police where she attained the rank of Superintendent, at the time of her retirement she was attached to ACT Policing in charge on Police Communications. She retired from the Australian Federal Police in 2022 to pursue her football career full time. She moved from Canberra to Adelaide in 2015 where she began pursuing a high level coaching career in football in addition to her work with the AFP.

She holds a degree in Journalism and once worked as a media advisory in the Labor government of the 1990s. Goddard also holds a degree in Persian language from the Australian National University.

Goddard is dating writer and actress Shanrah Wakefield.

References

External links

Bec Goddard's profile from AustralianFootball.com

Living people
Australian Federal Police
1978 births
AFL Women's coaches
Australian LGBT sportspeople
Lesbian sportswomen
Recipients of the Medal of the Order of Australia
21st-century LGBT people